The Lua programming language is a lightweight multi-paradigm language designed primarily for embedded systems and clients.

This is a list of applications which use Lua for the purpose of extensibility.

Video games 

In video game development, Lua is widely used as a scripting language by game programmers, perhaps due to its perceived easiness to embed, fast execution, and short learning curve.

In 2003, a poll conducted by GameDev.net showed Lua as the most popular scripting language for game programming. On 12 January 2012, Lua was announced as a winner of the Front Line Award 2011 from the magazine Game Developer in the category Programming Tools.

Other uses 
Other applications using Lua include:

 3DMLW plugin uses Lua scripting for animating 3D and handling different events.
 ACR-CV IoT oriented hardware uses Lua for scripting end application behavior.
 Adobe Photoshop Lightroom uses Lua for its user interface.
 Aerospike Database uses Lua as its internal scripting language for its 'UDF' (User Defined Function) capabilities, similar to procedures
 Apache HTTP Server can use Lua anywhere in the request process (since version 2.3, via the core mod_lua module).
 arcapos A point of sale system that can be extended using Lua.
 Ardour hard disk recorder and digital audio workstation application uses Lua for scripting including the ability to process audio and Midi.
 Artweaver graphics editor uses Lua for scripting filters.
 Autodesk Stingray, a game engine which uses Lua for developing video games.
 Awesome, a window manager, is written partly in Lua, also using it as its configuration file format
 Blackmagic Fusion can be extended and automated through a comprehensive Lua API, as a faster alternative to the Python API.
 The Canon Hack Development Kit (CHDK), an open source firmware for Canon cameras, uses Lua as one of two scripting languages.
 Celestia, the astronomy educational program, uses Lua as its scripting language.
 Cheat Engine, a memory editor/debugger, enables Lua scripts to be embedded in its "cheat table" files, and even includes a GUI designer.
 Cisco Systems uses Lua to implement Dynamic Access Policies within the Adaptive Security Appliance (ASA), and also SIP normalization in Cisco Unified Communications Manager (CUCM).
 Conky, the Linux system monitoring app, uses Lua for advanced graphics.
 Cocos2d uses Lua to build games with their Cocos Code IDE.
 Codea is a Lua editor native to the iOS operating-system.
 Core uses Lua for user scripts.
 CRYENGINE uses Lua for user scripts.
 Custom applications for the Creative Technology Zen X-Fi2 portable media player can be created in Lua.
 Damn Small Linux uses Lua to provide desktop-friendly interfaces for command-line utilities without sacrificing much disk space.
 The darktable open-source photography workflow application is scriptable with Lua.
 Certain tasks in DaVinci Resolve can be automated by Lua scripts, in addition to the more advanced scripting functionality specific to the Fusion page integrated within DaVinci Resolve. Like in Fusion, a Python API can also be used.
 The Daylon Leveller heightfield/terrain modeler uses embedded Lua to let plug-ins be more easily developed.
 DFHack, a memory hacker for Dwarf Fortress, uses Lua for its script system.
 Dolphin Computer Access uses Lua scripting to make inaccessible applications accessible for visually impaired computer users with their screen reader, SuperNova.
 Eyeon's Fusion compositor uses embedded Lua and LuaJIT for internal and external scripts and also plugin prototyping.
 A fork of the NES emulator FCE Ultra called FCEUX allows for extensions or modifications to games via Lua scripts.
 In the videogame Factorio, Lua is used for creating mods and scenarios (expanding the game with scripting)
 Flame, a large and highly sophisticated piece of malware being used for cyber espionage.
 Foldit, a science-oriented game in protein folding, uses Lua for user scripts. Some of those scripts have been the aim of an article in PNAS.
 FreeBSD's default bootloader is implemented in Lua as of version 13.0.
 FreePOPs, an extensible mail proxy, uses Lua to power its web front-end.
 Freeswitch, an open-source telephony platform, can make use of Lua as a scripting language for call control and call flow among other things.
Garry's Mod, a sandbox video game, uses Lua for mods, called addons, published on the Steam Workshop.
 Geany, a code editor, has a Lua plugin, GeanyLua.
 Ginga, the middleware for Brazilian Digital Television System (SBTVD or ISDB-T), uses Lua as a script language to its declarative environment, Ginga-NCL. In Ginga-NCL, Lua is integrated as media objects (called NCLua) inside NCL (Nested Context Language) documents.
 GrafX2, a pixel-art editor, can run Lua scripts for simple picture processing or generative illustration.
 GrandMA2 and GrandMA3, the lighting console and software powering most large-scale concert events worldwide, use Lua scripting for their plugin extensions.
 HAProxy, a reverse proxying software, may be extended with Lua starting from version 1.6.
 Harmony Assistant, a musical score editor embeds Lua 4 based language called MyrScript, it extends features: users can create user interfaces (dialogs) and handle musical objects as well as digital sounds.
 Hollywood, a cross-platform programming language using Lua.
 iClone, a 3D real-time animation studio to create animation movies uses Lua in the controls of its new physics simulation.
 The drawing editor Ipe (mainly used for producing figures with LaTeX labeling) uses Lua for its functionality and script extensions.
 Leadwerks Game Engine uses Lua for user scripts.
 Lego Mindstorms NXT and NXT 2.0 can be scripted with Lua using third-party software.
 lighttpd web server uses Lua for hook scripts as well as a modern replacement for the Cache Meta Language.
 LÖVE, a 2D game framework for Lua (programming language).
 Luakit, a highly configurable web browser framework based on the WebKit web content engine and the GTK+ toolkit, is extensible with Lua.
 LuaTeX, the designated successor of pdfTeX, allows extensions to be written in Lua.
 LuatOS, an open-source and free RTOS, helps control hardware within Lua script.
 LuCI, the default web interface for OpenWrt, is written primarily in Lua.
 Mako Server provides a compact and efficient Lua web framework and non-blocking asynchronous sockets with many ready to use web applications available on GitHub 
 MediaWiki, which is used on Wikipedia and other wikis, uses Lua as a templating language provided by Scribunto extension.
 Minecraft modifications like ComputerCraft or OpenComputers allow players to execute Lua on in-game computers.
 Minetest uses Lua for in-game programming of robots, microcontrollers and sorting tubes, using popular addons.
 Moho, an animation software package distributed by Smith Micro Software, uses Lua as its scripting language, and all of its native tools are built as editable scripts.
 mpv (crossplatform media player, an mplayer fork) uses Lua as a scripting language.
 MySQL Workbench uses Lua for its extensions and add-ons.
 Neovim text editor offers Lua functionality as a replacement for Vimscript as a scripting language, both for plugin development and for user configuration.
 NetBSD has a Lua driver that can create and control Lua states inside the kernel. This allows Lua to be used for packet filtering and creating device drivers.
 nmap network security scanner uses Lua as the basis for its scripting language, called nse.
 NodeMCU uses Lua in hardware. NodeMCU is an open source hardware platform, which can run Lua directly on the ESP8266 Wi-Fi SoC.
 NSBase is a database management software. Lua scripting is used to dynamize forms and reports. It's a software workshop that allows you to create real database management applications.
 NUT allows Applications written in Lua.
 OpenResty, a web platform based on nginx, supports Lua scripting in different execution phases.
 Orbiter (simulator) Space Flight Simulator offers some Lua API allowing to customize simulation feedback, or to automatize simple maneuvers 
 pandoc, a universal document converter, allows modifications of the internal document representation via Lua scripts.
 Sierra Wireless AirLink ALEOS GSM / CDMA / LTE gateways allow user applications to be written in Lua.
Peakboard is a visualization solution that uses Lua in its software, the Peakboard Designer, to create interactivity, filter data in a dataflow, create complex rules for formatting and displaying text, and to write information back to a database.
 PowerDNS offers extensive Lua scripting for serving and changing DNS answers, fixing up broken servers, and DoS protection.
 Project Dogwaffle Professional offers Lua scripting to make filters through the DogLua filter. Lua filters can be shared between Project Dogwaffle, GIMP, Pixarra Twistedbrush and ArtWeaver.
 Prosody is a cross-platform Jabber/XMPP server written in Lua.
 QSC Audio Products supports Lua scripting for control of external devices and other advanced functionality within Q-SYS Designer.
 Quartz Composer, a visual programming tool by Apple, can be scripted in Lua via a free plugin produced by Boinx Software.
 Ravenfield (video game) is a first person shooter sandbox game that uses a modified version of Lua.
 REAPER digital audio workstation supports Lua scripting to extend functionality.
 Reason digital audio workstation uses Lua to describe remote codecs.
 Redis, an open source key-value database, uses Lua (starting with version 2.6) to write complex functions that run in the server itself, thus extending its functionality.
 Renoise audio tracker uses Lua scripting to extend functionality.
 RetroShare encrypted filesharing, serverless email, instant messaging, online chat and BBS software, has a Lua plugin for automation and control.
 Roblox is a game platform with its own game engine. It uses a modified version of Lua 5.1 called Luau.
 Rockbox, the open-source digital audio player firmware, supports plugins written in Lua.
 RPM, software package management system primarily developed for Red Hat Linux, comes with an embedded Lua interpreter.
 SAS integrates Lua with PROC LUA as an alternative to its legacy macro language.
 New versions of SciTE editor can be extended using Lua.
 Snort intrusion detection system includes a Lua interpreter since 3.0 beta release.
 The Squeezebox music players from Logitech support plugins written in Lua on recent models (Controller, Radio and Touch).
Stormworks: Build and Rescue use Lua for microcontrollers scripting / monitor scripting
 Tarantool uses Lua as the stored procedure language for its NoSQL database management system, and acts as a Lua application server.
 TeamSpeak has a Lua scripting plugin for modifications.
 TerraME uses Lua to provide a programming interface for simulating geospatial dynamic models 
 TI-Nspire calculators contain applications written in Lua, since TI added Lua scripting support with a calculator-specific API in OS 3+.
 Torch is an open source deep learning library for Lua.
 Varnish can execute Lua scripts in the request process by extending VCL through the Lua VMOD (Varnish module).
 Vim has Lua scripting support starting with version 7.3.
 VLC media player uses Lua to provide scripting support.
 Warframe uses Lua for HUD purposes and several other UI operations
 Waze uses Lua internally. waze-4-35-0-15.apk includes Lua 5.3.3.
 WeeChat IRC client allows scripts to be written in Lua.
 WinGate proxy server allows event processing and policy to execute Lua scripts with access to internal WinGate objects.
 Wireshark network packet analyzer allows protocol dissectors, post-dissectors, and taps to be written in Lua.
 wrk is a modern HTTP benchmarking tool capable of generating significant load when run on a single multi-core CPU.
 X-Plane uses lua for aircraft systems and plugins.
 ZeroBrane Studio Lua IDE is written in Lua and uses Lua for its plugins.
 Suricata IDS/IPS supports Lua scripting to enhance its intrusion detection capabilities.

References

External links 

 eLua, Embedded Lua (a version of Lua specifically tailored for use in embedded systems).
 Projects in Lua
 Ravi, derivative of Lua 5.3 with limited optional static typing and an LLVM based JIT compiler
 SquiLu, Squirrel modified with Lua libraries

 
Lua